Marlborough is a former New Zealand parliamentary electorate, in the Marlborough region at the top of the South Island. It existed from 1938 to 1996, and was represented by five Members of Parliament.

Population centres
The 1931 New Zealand census had been cancelled due to the Great Depression, so the 1937 electoral redistribution had to take ten years of population growth into account. The increasing population imbalance between the North and South Islands had slowed, and only one electorate seat was transferred from south to north. Five electorates were abolished, one former electorate was re-established, and four electorates were created for the first time, including Marlborough. The Marlborough electorate replaced the  electorate, which had more or less the same shape as Wairau had had since the 1927 electoral redistribution. For the purposes of the country quota, the 1936 census had determined that some 27% of the population lived in urban areas, and the balance in rural areas.

Settlements that were covered by the original electorate included Havelock, Picton, Blenheim, and Kaikoura. The area is noted for growing grapes for white wine.

History
The electorate was created in 1938, replacing the Wairau electorate. Ted Meachen of the Labour Party, who had previously represented Wairau, was the first representative.

In 1996 with the advent of mixed-member proportional (MMP) representation the electorate was included into the Kaikōura electorate. The then MP Doug Kidd was the first MP for Kaikōura.

Members of Parliament
Key

Election results

1993 election

1990 election

1987 election

1984 election

1981 election

1978 election

1975 election

1972 election

1970 by-election

1969 election

1966 election

1963 election

1960 election

1957 election

1954 election

1951 election

1949 election

1946 election

1943 election

1938 election

Notes

References

Historical electorates of New Zealand
Politics of the Marlborough Region
1938 establishments in New Zealand
1996 disestablishments in New Zealand